Antón García Caro (1560-c.1624) was a Spanish jurist and politician, who performed legal functions during the Viceroyalty of Peru, serving as escribano and procurador of Buenos Aires.

Biography 

He was born in Carmona, Seville, Spain, son of a Spanish family of Basque ancestors. He was married to María Gómez de Sanabria, daughter of Captain Juan Gómes de Sanabria and María de Sotomayor y Ruiz de Orellana, a noble woman possibly linked to the House of Méndez de Sotomayor. 

Antón García Caro arrived at the Río de la Plata from Cádiz in the expedition Alonso de Vera y Aragón. He belonged to the second contingent of settlers that was established in the city of Buenos Aires after the second foundation. In 1588, Juan Torre de Vera y Aragón granted him lands located in the vicinity of Luján river.

References

External links 
Acuerdos del extinguido Cabildo de Buenos Aires - archive.org

1560 births
1624 deaths
Spanish colonial governors and administrators
People from Buenos Aires
Explorers of South America
Spanish conquistadors
Spanish notaries
Spanish people of Basque descent